Ølen is a former municipality in the Vestlandet region of Norway.  The municipality existed from 1916 until 2006, and originally it was a part of Hordaland county, but in 2002 it was transferred to Rogaland county prior to its dissolution in 2006. The  municipality was located on the south side of the Bjoafjorden and east of the Ålfjorden.  The administrative center of Ølen was the village of Ølensjøen. The municipality of Ølen makes up the northern part of the present-day Vindafjord Municipality in Rogaland county.

History

The parish of Ølen was established as a municipality on 1 July 1916 when it was split off from the large municipality of Fjelberg. Initially, Ølen had 1,715 residents. During the 1960s, there were many municipal mergers across Norway due to the work of the Schei Committee. On 1 January 1964, the neighboring municipality of Vikebygd was dissolved and the eastern half of it (population: 578) was merged into the municipality of Ølen.

On 1 January 2002, the municipality of Ølen was transferred administratively from Hordaland county to Rogaland county. On 1 January 2003, the people of Ølen and the neighboring municipality of Vindafjord held a merger referendum which was successful. On 1 January 2006, Ølen and Vindafjord merged, forming a larger municipality called Vindafjord. Before the merger, Ølen had a population of 3,426. The coat of arms of the new Vindafjord municipality bears the design of the old Ølen arms and the colours of the old Vindafjord arms.

Government

The municipal council  of Ølen was made up of 21 representatives that were elected to four-year terms.  The party breakdown of the final municipal council of Ølen was as follows:

See also
List of former municipalities of Norway

References

Vindafjord
Former municipalities of Norway
1916 establishments in Norway
2006 disestablishments in Norway